Mount Pānīʻau is a shield volcano located on the Hawaiian island of Niʻihau.

References 

Shield volcanoes of the United States
Landforms of Niihau
Volcanoes of Hawaii